Horia is a commune in Neamț County, Western Moldavia, Romania. It is composed of two villages, Cotu Vameș and Horia.

Natives
 Otilia Cazimir (1894–1967), poet
 Radu Timofte (1949–2009), head of the Romanian Intelligence Service from 2001 to 2006

References

Communes in Neamț County
Localities in Western Moldavia